Max Oberrauch (born April 26, 1984) is an Italian professional ice hockey player. He is currently playing with the HC Pustertal Wölfe in the Italian Serie A.

He participated at the 2010 IIHF World Championship as a member of the Italian National men's ice hockey team.

He is brother-in-law of Swedish ice hockey player Jonas Almtorp.

References

External links

1984 births
Italian ice hockey forwards
Living people
Ice hockey people from Bolzano